Call–Exner bodies, giving a follicle-like appearance, are small eosinophilic fluid-filled punched out spaces between granulosa cells. The granulosa cells are usually arranged haphazardly around the space.

They are pathognomonic for granulosa cell tumors.

Histologically, these tumors consists of monotonous islands of granulosa cells with "coffee-bean" nuclei. That same nuclear groove appearance noted in Brenner tumour, an epithelial-stromal ovarian tumor distinguishable by nests of transitional epithelial cells (urothelial) with longitudinal nuclear grooves (coffee bean nuclei) in abundant fibrous stroma.

They are composed of membrane-packaged secretion of granulosa cells and have relations to the formation of liquor folliculi which are seen among closely arranged granulosa cells.

They are named for Emma Louise Call (1847–1937), an American physician, and Sigmund Exner (1846-1926), an Austrian physiologist.

References

External links
 WebPathology

Histopathology